Tenodera parasinensis is a species of praying mantis.

References

Mantidae
Insects described in 2004